I. minutus  may refer to:
 Imperceptus minutus, a jumping spider species found in India
 Ixobrychus minutus, the little bittern, a wading bird species native to the Old World

See also
 List of Latin and Greek words commonly used in systematic names#M